Sedin Dekha Hoyechilo is a 2010 Indian romantic Bengali film directed by Sujit Mondal. It's a Shree Venkatesh Films production. The film stars Dev and Srabanti Chatterjee in lead roles while Tapas Paul, Premjit, Kaushik Banerjee, Laboni Sarkar, Shakuntala Barua and many more in supporting role. The film is remake of 2008 Telugu movie Parugu. Sedin Dekha Hoyechilo brought the two stars of Bengali cinema Dev and Srabanti Chatterjee for the second time after Dujone.

Plot
Nandini's elder sister elopes with her boyfriend on the day of her marriage. Neelkantha Roy, her father, a very strict and stern man, decides to find them at any cost. He manages to locate four of Ajoy's friends from different places and brings them over to his place, out of which one of them is Abeer. He holds them captive until they tell about the couple's whereabouts. They tell him that they don't know anything, but no one believes them. They decide to flee one day, but Abeer falls in love with a girl though he is unable to see her face. They are again held captive.

Nandini learns that she is the girl whom Abeer had told her to locate, but she does not inform him. Abeer and his friends go with Neelkantha's men to town one day to Kavita and Ajoy, where Abeer helps them to board a bus to Kolkata. Nandini's uncle accidentally learns that Abeer had helped them to flee when he accidentally overhears Nandini's conversation. The entire group is beaten badly.

Abeer and his friends, as well as Nandini, accompanies her father to Kolkata to find the couple. Abeer even saves Nandini from goons one day, and the entire group even stay in Abeer's house. Then on that night, Nandini confesses her love for Abir, and they hug each other. They are able to locate the couple one day, but once Kavita replies back to her father, he decides to let them go and stay in peace. The group go back home from Kolkata, and Nandini's marriage is fixed. Abeer and his friends arrive on the day of her marriage, and Neelkantha learns about their relationship. Though Abeer's friends plan and bring Nandini away so that she can elope, Abeer decides against it and decides to leave. He is stopped at the last moment by Neelkantha, who tells him to take Nandini away, who also appears there. Then Nandini and Abir hug. This is a remake of the Telugu film Parugu starring Allu Arjun and Sheela.

Cast
 Dev as Abir
 Srabanti Chatterjee as Nandini
 Tapas Paul as Neelkanta Roy
 Premjit Mukherjee as Bikash Roy, Neelkanta's younger Brother
 Kaushik Banerjee as Neelkanta's Brother
 Laboni Sarkar as Abir's Mother
 Shakuntala Barua as Nandini's Grandmother
 Mousumi Saha as Neelkanta's Wife
 Prasun Gain as Abir's friend
 Pradip Dhar as Abir's friend
 Parthasarathi Chakraborty as Abir's friend
 Raju Majumdar as Abir's friend
 Kanchan Mullick as a special appearance
 Supriyo Dutta as Police Officer Biswanath Babu
 Gopal Talukdar as Ajay, Abir's friend

Soundtrack

References

External links
 

2010 films
2010s Bengali-language films
Bengali-language Indian films
Bengali remakes of Telugu films
Indian romantic action films
2010s romantic action films
Films scored by Rishi Chanda